The Dr Croke Cup  is a trophy awarded annually by the Gaelic Athletic Association to the schools (sometimes referred to as colleges) hurling team that wins the National Hurling League title. The trophy is named after Thomas Croke, a former Catholic Archbishop of Cashel and one of the first patrons of the GAA.

References

Hurling cup competitions
National Hurling League